Diogmites angustipennis, the prairie robber fly, is a species of robber flies in the family Asilidae.

References

Further reading

External links

 

Asilidae
Articles created by Qbugbot
Insects described in 1866